The 1931 Southwest Sumatra earthquake occurred on 25 September at 05:59 UTC. It was located between the Enggano Island and Sumatra, Indonesia, then under the rule of Dutch East Indies. It had a magnitude of  7.3, or  7.5.

The earthquake occurred off southwest Sumatra. Some huts were shifted by about 0.5 metre. The earthquake could be felt in Padang, more than 500 km away and in Bandung, about 600 km away. It was reported that the earthquake was even felt in Pamekasan, Madura Island, about 1250 km away. A tsunami of 1 metre high was reported.

See also
 List of earthquakes in 1931
 List of earthquakes in Indonesia

References

External links

Earthquakes in Sumatra
Southwest Sumatra earthquake, 1931
1931 tsunamis
Earthquakes in Indonesia
Tsunamis in Indonesia
September 1931 events
1931 in the Dutch East Indies
1931 disasters in Asia 
1931 disasters in Oceania 
20th-century disasters in Indonesia